John Brooks (June 13, 1785 – February 19, 1869) was the ninth mayor of Columbus, Ohio. He was the first mayor elected by popular vote in the City of Columbus on April 14, 1834.  He was elected to a two-year term, but only served for one year.  He resigned from office on April 21, 1835.  John Bailhache was appointed by city council to complete the unexpired term of Brooks's tenure.

References

Bibliography

Further reading

External links

John Brooks at Political Graveyard

1785 births
1869 deaths
Burials at Green Lawn Cemetery (Columbus, Ohio)
Mayors of Columbus, Ohio
19th-century American politicians
People from Lincolnville, Maine